The annual business survey, formerly the annual business inquiry, is a census of production in the United Kingdom, produced by the Office for National Statistics. It was introduced in 1988 and consolidated earlier surveys. Results were first published in 2000.

External links
Office for National Statistics: Annual Business Survey: Survey at a glance
Office for National Statistics: Annual Business Survey: ABS News

Economy of the United Kingdom
Business in the United Kingdom
1988 introductions
Censuses in the United Kingdom